The 15th United States Congress was a meeting of the legislative branch of the United States federal government, consisting of the United States Senate and the United States House of Representatives. It met in the Old Brick Capitol in Washington, D.C. from March 4, 1817, to March 4, 1819, during the first two years of James Monroe's presidency.  The apportionment of seats in the House of Representatives was based on the 1810 United States census. Both chambers had a Democratic-Republican majority.

Letter of December 1818
Two major treaties with the United Kingdom were approved, finalized and signed during the 15th Congress, both the Rush–Bagot Treaty and the Treaty of 1818, both of which pertained to the United States-Canada border, and both of which were overwhelmingly popular in the United States.  President James Monroe and Secretary of State John Quincy Adams were credited with the accomplishments.  A letter signed by many members of congress expressing "Gratitude, amity and brotherhood with Great Britain" was addressed to British Prime Minister Robert Jenkinson, 2nd Earl of Liverpool, British Secretary of State for War and the Colonies Henry Bathurst, 3rd Earl Bathurst, British foreign secretary Robert Stewart, Viscount Castlereagh and Britain's minister plenipotentiary and envoy extraordinaire to the United States Charles Bagot.  The letter also attacked King Louis XVIII of France for insulting remarks he had made towards American diplomats and about the United States, as well as his refusal to pay reparations owed to the United States from damages incurred during the Quasi-War. The letter was signed in December 1818 by Joel Abbot, Thomas W. Cobb, Zadock Cook, Joel Crawford, John Forsyth, William Terrell, Charles Tait, William Smith, John Gaillard, Henry Middleton, William Lowndes, James Ervin, Joseph Bellinger, Starling Tucker, Eldred Simkins, Elias Earle, Wilson Nesbitt, Stephen Decatur Miller, Montfort Stokes, Nathaniel Macon, Lemuel Sawyer, Joseph Hunter Bryan, Thomas H. Hall, Jesse Slocumb, James Owen, Weldon Nathaniel Edwards, James Stewart, James Strudwick Smith, Thomas Settle, George Mumford, Daniel Munroe Forney, Felix Walker, Lewis Williams, John J. Crittenden, Isham Talbot, David Trimble, Henry Clay, Richard Mentor Johnson, Joseph Desha, Anthony New, David Walker, George Robertson, Richard Clough Anderson Jr., Tunstall Quarles, Thomas Speed, William Hendricks, James Noble, Waller Taylor, John Eaton, John Williams, John Rhea, William Grainger Blount, Francis Jones, Samuel E. Hogg, Thomas Claiborne, George W.L. Marr, George Poindexter, Prentiss Mellen, Harrison Gray Otis, Enoch Lincoln, Jonathan Mason, Nathaniel Silsbee, Jeremiah Nelson, Timothy Fuller, Elijah H. Mills, Samuel Clesson Allen, Henry Shaw, Zabdiel Sampson, Walter Folger Jr., Marcus Morton, Benjamin Adams, Solomon Strong, Nathaniel Ruggles, John Holmes, Ezekiel Whitman, Benjamin Orr, John Wilson, Thomas Rice, Joshua Gage and Albion Parris, all of whom also voted to ratify both of the aforementioned treaties. Several governors also signed the letter, which was entirely symbolic and intended as a gesture of goodwill, including Gabriel Slaughter, William Rabun, John Geddes, John Branch, John Brooks, James Patton Preston and David Holmes.  This was significant because the governors and the members of congress were from different regions (both Massachusetts and several southern states were represented), and because signers came from both the Whig Party and the Democratic-Republicans.  Many members of congress and Washington DC had a very hostile relationship with France's notoriously combative ambassador Jean-Guillaume, baron Hyde de Neuville, which contributed to the letters contents as per France.

Major events

 March 4, 1817: James Monroe became President of the United States
 July 4, 1817: Construction on the Erie Canal began
 November 20, 1817: The first Seminole War began in Florida
 January 2, 1819: The Panic of 1819, the first major financial crisis in the United States, began.
 February 2, 1819: Dartmouth College v. Woodward: Supreme Court allowed Dartmouth to keep its charter and remain a private institution.

Major legislation

 April 4, 1818: Flag Act of 1818, Sess. 1, ch. 34,

Treaties 
 April 29, 1817: Rush–Bagot Treaty signed between the U.S. and the United Kingdom
 October 20, 1818: Treaty of 1818 between the U.S. and the United Kingdom established the northern boundary as the 49th parallel from the Lake of the Woods to the Rocky Mountains, also creating the Northwest Angle.
 February 22, 1819: Adams-Onís Treaty: Spain ceded Florida to the United States

States admitted and territories created 
 December 10, 1817: Mississippi admitted as the 20th state
 December 3, 1818: Illinois admitted as the 21st state
 March 2, 1819: Arkansas Territory was created, ; it was formerly part of the Missouri Territory

Party summary
The count below identifies party affiliations at the beginning of the first session of this congress. Changes resulting from subsequent replacements are shown below in the "Changes in membership" section.

Senate 
During this congress, two Senate seats were added for each of the new states of Mississippi and Illinois.

House of Representatives 
During this congress, one House seat was added for each of the new states of Mississippi and Illinois.

Leadership

Senate 
 President: Daniel D. Tompkins (DR)
 President pro tempore:
 John Gaillard (DR), elected March 4, 1817 
 James Barbour (DR), elected February 15, 1819

House of Representatives 
Speaker: Henry Clay (DR)

Members
This list is arranged by chamber, then by state. Senators are listed by class and representatives are listed by district.

Skip to House of Representatives, below

Senate
Senators were elected by the state legislatures every two years, with one-third beginning new six-year terms with each Congress. Preceding the names in the list below are Senate class numbers, which indicate the cycle of their election. In this Congress, Class 1 meant their term began in the last Congress, requiring re-election in 1820; Class 2 meant their term began with this Congress, requiring re-election in 1822; and Class 3 meant their term ended with this Congress, requiring re-election in 1818.

Connecticut 
 1. Samuel W. Dana (F)
 3. David Daggett (F)

Delaware 
 1. Outerbridge Horsey (F)
 2. Nicholas Van Dyke (F)

Georgia 
 2. George Troup (DR), until September 23, 1818
 John Forsyth (DR), November 23, 1818 – February 17, 1819
 3. Charles Tait (DR)

Illinois 
 2. Jesse B. Thomas (DR), from December 3, 1818 (newly admitted state)
 3. Ninian Edwards (DR), from December 3, 1818 (newly admitted state)

Indiana 
 1. James Noble (DR)
 3. Waller Taylor (DR)

Kentucky 
 2. John J. Crittenden (DR), until March 3, 1819
 3. Isham Talbot (DR)

Louisiana 
 2. William C. C. Claiborne (DR), died November 23, 1817
 Henry Johnson (DR), from January 12, 1818
 3. Eligius Fromentin (DR)

Maryland 
 1. Alexander C. Hanson (F)
 3. Robert H. Goldsborough (F)

Massachusetts 
 1. Eli P. Ashmun (F), until May 10, 1818
 Prentiss Mellen (F), from June 5, 1818
 2. Harrison Gray Otis (F)

Mississippi 
 1. Walter Leake (DR), from December 10, 1817 (newly admitted state)
 2. Thomas H. Williams (DR), from December 10, 1817 (newly admitted state)

New Hampshire 
 2. David L. Morril (DR)
 3. Jeremiah Mason (F), until June 16, 1817
 Clement Storer (DR), from June 27, 1817

New Jersey 
 1. James J. Wilson (DR)
 2. Mahlon Dickerson (DR)

New York 
 1. Nathan Sanford (DR)
 3. Rufus King (F)

North Carolina 
 2. Montfort Stokes (DR)
 3. Nathaniel Macon (DR)

Ohio 
 1. Benjamin Ruggles (DR)
 3. Jeremiah Morrow (DR)

Pennsylvania 
 1. Jonathan Roberts (DR)
 3. Abner Lacock (DR)

Rhode Island 
 1. William Hunter (F)
 2. James Burrill Jr. (F)

South Carolina 
 2. William Smith (DR)
 3. John Gaillard (DR)

Tennessee 
 1. George W. Campbell (DR), until April 20, 1818
 John Eaton (DR), from September 5, 1818
 2. John Williams (DR)

Vermont 
 1. Isaac Tichenor (F)
 3. Dudley Chase (DR), until November 3, 1817
 James Fisk (DR), November 4, 1817 – January 8, 1818
 William A. Palmer (DR), from October 20, 1818

Virginia 
 1. James Barbour (DR)
 2. John W. Eppes (DR)

House of Representatives
The names of members of the House of Representatives are preceded by their district numbers.

Connecticut 
All representatives were elected statewide on a general ticket.
 . Uriel Holmes (F), until 1818
 Sylvester Gilbert (DR), from November 16, 1818
 . Ebenezer Huntington (F)
 . Jonathan O. Moseley (F)
 . Timothy Pitkin (F)
 . Samuel B. Sherwood (F)
 . Nathaniel Terry (F)
 . Thomas S. Williams (F)

Delaware 
Both representatives were elected statewide on a general ticket.
 . Willard Hall (DR)
 . Louis McLane (F)

Georgia 
All representatives were elected statewide on a general ticket.
 . Joel Abbot (DR)
 . Thomas W. Cobb (DR)
 . Zadock Cook (DR)
 . Joel Crawford (DR)
 . John Forsyth (DR), until November 23, 1818
 Robert R. Reid (DR), from February 18, 1819
 . William Terrell (DR)

Illinois 
 . John McLean (DR), from December 3, 1818 (newly admitted state)

Indiana 
 . William Hendricks (DR)

Kentucky 
 . David Trimble (DR)
 . Henry Clay (DR)
 . Richard M. Johnson (DR)
 . Joseph Desha (DR)
 . Anthony New (DR)
 . David Walker (DR)
 . George Robertson (DR)
 . Richard C. Anderson Jr. (DR)
 . Tunstal Quarles (DR)
 . Thomas Speed (DR)

Louisiana 
 . Thomas B. Robertson (DR), until April 20, 1818
 Thomas Butler (DR), from November 16, 1818

Maryland 
The 5th district was a plural district with two representatives.
 . Philip Stuart (F)
 . John C. Herbert (F)
 . George Peter (F)
 . Samuel Ringgold (DR)
 . Peter Little (DR)
 . Samuel Smith (DR)
 . Philip Reed (DR)
 . Thomas Culbreth (DR)
 . Thomas Bayly (F)

Massachusetts 
 . Jonathan Mason (F)
 . Nathaniel Silsbee (DR)
 . Jeremiah Nelson (F)
 . Timothy Fuller (DR)
 . Elijah H. Mills (F)
 . Samuel C. Allen (F)
 . Henry Shaw (DR)
 . Zabdiel Sampson (DR)
 . Walter Folger Jr. (DR)
 . Marcus Morton (DR)
 . Benjamin Adams (F)
 . Solomon Strong (F)
 . Nathaniel Ruggles (F)
 . John Holmes (DR)
 . Ezekiel Whitman (F)
 . Benjamin Orr (F)
 . John Wilson (F)
 . Thomas Rice (F)
 . Joshua Gage (DR)
 . Albion K. Parris (DR), until February 3, 1818
 Enoch Lincoln (DR), from November 4, 1818

Mississippi 
 . George Poindexter (DR), from December 10, 1817

New Hampshire 
All representatives were elected statewide on a general ticket.
 . Josiah Butler (DR)
 . Clifton Clagett (DR)
 . Salma Hale (DR)
 . Arthur Livermore (DR)
 . John F. Parrott (DR)
 . Nathaniel Upham (DR)

New Jersey 
All representatives were elected statewide on a general ticket.
 . Ephraim Bateman (DR)
 . Benjamin Bennet (DR)
 . Joseph Bloomfield (DR)
 . Charles Kinsey (DR)
 . John Linn (DR)
 . Henry Southard (DR)

New York 
There were six plural districts, the 1st, 2nd, 12th, 15th, 20th & 21st, each had two representatives.
 . Tredwell Scudder (DR)
 . George Townsend (DR)
 . William Irving (DR)
 . Peter H. Wendover (DR)
 . Caleb Tompkins (DR)
 . James Tallmadge Jr. (DR), from December 1, 1817
 . Philip J. Schuyler (F)
 . James W. Wilkin (DR)
 . Josiah Hasbrouck (DR)
 . Dorrance Kirtland (DR)
 . Rensselaer Westerlo (F)
 . John P. Cushman (F)
 . John W. Taylor (DR)
 . John Palmer (DR)
 . John Savage (DR)
 . Thomas Lawyer (DR)
 . John Herkimer (DR)
 . John R. Drake (DR)
 . Isaac Williams Jr. (DR)
 . Henry R. Storrs (F)
 . Thomas H. Hubbard (DR)
 . David A. Ogden (F)
 . James Porter (DR)
 . Oliver C. Comstock (DR)
 . Daniel Cruger (DR)
 . Benjamin Ellicott (DR)
 . John C. Spencer (DR)

North Carolina 
 . Lemuel Sawyer (DR)
 . Joseph H. Bryan (DR)
 . Thomas H. Hall (DR)
 . Jesse Slocumb (F)
 . James Owen (DR)
 . Weldon N. Edwards (DR)
 .James Stewart (F), from January 5, 1818
 . James S. Smith (DR)
 . Thomas Settle (DR)
 . George Mumford (DR), until December 31, 1818
 Charles Fisher (DR), from February 11, 1819
 . Daniel M. Forney (DR), until 1818
 William Davidson (F), from December 2, 1818
 . Felix Walker (DR)
 . Lewis Williams (DR)

Ohio 
 . William Henry Harrison (DR)
 . John W. Campbell (DR)
 . Levi Barber (DR)
 . Samuel Herrick (DR)
 . Philemon Beecher (F)
 . Peter Hitchcock (DR)

Pennsylvania 
There were six plural districts, the 2nd, 3rd, 5th, 6th & 10th had two representatives each, the 1st had four representatives.
 . William Anderson (DR)
 . Joseph Hopkinson (F)
 . John Sergeant (F)
 . Adam Seybert (DR)
 . Isaac Darlington (F)
 . Levi Pawling (F)
 . James M. Wallace (DR)
 . John Whiteside (DR)
 . Jacob Spangler (DR), until April 20, 1818
 Jacob Hostetter (DR), from November 16, 1818
 . Andrew Boden (DR)
 . William Maclay (DR)
 . Samuel D. Ingham (DR), until July 6, 1818
 Samuel Moore (DR), from October 13, 1818
 . John Ross (DR), until February 24, 1818
 Thomas J. Rogers (DR), from March 3, 1818
 . Joseph Hiester (DR)
 . Alexander Ogle (DR)
 . William P. Maclay (DR)
 . John Murray (DR), from October 14, 1817
 . William Wilson (DR)
 . David Marchand (DR)
 . Thomas Patterson (DR)
 . Christian Tarr (DR)
 . Henry Baldwin (DR)
 . Robert Moore (DR)

Rhode Island 
Both representatives were elected statewide on a general ticket.
 . John L. Boss Jr. (F)
 . James B. Mason (F)

South Carolina 
 . Henry Middleton (DR)
 . William Lowndes (DR)
 . James Ervin (DR)
 . Joseph Bellinger (DR)
 . Starling Tucker (DR)
 . John C. Calhoun (DR), until November 3, 1817
 Eldred Simkins (DR), from January 24, 1818
 . Elias Earle (DR)
 . Wilson Nesbitt (DR)
 . Stephen D. Miller (DR)

Tennessee 
 . John Rhea (DR)
 . William G. Blount (DR)
 . Francis Jones (DR)
 . Samuel Hogg (DR)
 . Thomas Claiborne (DR)
 . George W. L. Marr (DR)

Vermont 
All representatives were elected statewide on a general ticket.
 . Heman Allen (DR), until April 20, 1818; vacant thereafter
 . Samuel C. Crafts (DR)
 . William Hunter (DR)
 . Orsamus C. Merrill (DR)
 . Charles Rich (DR)
 . Mark Richards (DR)

Virginia 
 . James Pindall (F)
 . Edward Colston (F)
 . Henry St. George Tucker (DR)
 . William McCoy (DR)
 . John Floyd (DR)
 . Alexander Smyth (DR)
 . Ballard Smith (DR)
 . Charles F. Mercer (F)
 . William Lee Ball (DR)
 . George F. Strother (DR)
 . Philip P. Barbour (DR)
 . Robert S. Garnett (DR)
 . Burwell Bassett (DR)
 . William A. Burwell (DR)
 . William J. Lewis (DR)
 . Archibald Austin (DR)
 . James Pleasants (DR)
 . Thomas M. Nelson (DR)
 . Peterson Goodwyn (DR), until February 21, 1818
 John Pegram (DR), from April 21, 1818
 . James Johnson (DR)
 . Thomas Newton Jr. (DR)
 . Hugh Nelson (DR)
 . John Tyler (DR)

Non-voting members 
 . John Crowell, from January 29, 1818
 . Nathaniel Pope, until November 30, 1818, vacant thereafter
 . Vacant until statehood December 10, 1817
 . John Scott, from August 4, 1817

Changes in membership
The count below reflects changes from the beginning of the first session of this Congress.

Senate 

|-
| New Hampshire(3)
|  | Jeremiah Mason (F)
| style="font-size:80%" | Resigned June 16, 1817
|  | Clement Storer (DR)
| Seated June 27, 1817
|-
| Vermont(3)
|  | Dudley Chase (DR)
| style="font-size:80%" | Resigned November 3, 1817, to become Chief Justice of the Vermont Supreme Court
|  | James Fisk (DR)
| Seated November 4, 1817
|-
| Louisiana(2)
|  | William C. C. Claiborne (DR)
| style="font-size:80%" | Died November 23, 1817
|  | Henry Johnson (DR)
| Seated January 12, 1818
|-
| Mississippi(1)
| rowspan=2 | New seats
| rowspan=2 style="font-size:80%" |  Mississippi was admitted to the Union on December 10, 1817
|  | Walter Leake (DR)
| rowspan=2 | Installed December 10, 1817
|-
| Mississippi(2)
|  | Thomas H. Williams (DR)
|-
| Vermont(3)
|  | James Fisk (DR)
| style="font-size:80%" | Resigned January 8, 1818, to become Vermont Collector of Customs.Winner elected October 20, 1818.
|  | William A. Palmer (DR)
| Seated October 20, 1818
|-
| Tennessee(1)
|  | George W. Campbell (DR)
| style="font-size:80%" | Resigned April 20, 1818, to become Ambassador to Russia
|  | John Eaton (DR)
| Seated September 5, 1818
|-
| Massachusetts(1)
|  | Eli P. Ashmun (F)
| style="font-size:80%" | Resigned May 10, 1818.Winner elected June 5, 1818.
|  | Prentiss Mellen (F)
| Seated June 5, 1818
|-
| Georgia(2)
|  | George Troup (DR)
| style="font-size:80%" | Resigned September 23, 1818, to run for Governor of Georgia.Winner elected September 23, 1818.
|  | John Forsyth (DR)
| Seated November 23, 1818
|-
| Illinois(2)
| rowspan=2 | New seats
| rowspan=2 style="font-size:80%" |  Illinois was admitted to the Union on December 3, 1818.
|  | Jesse B. Thomas (DR)
| rowspan=2 | Installed December 3, 1818
|-
| Illinois(3)
|  | Ninian Edwards (DR)
|-
| Georgia(2)
|  | John Forsyth (DR)
| style="font-size:80%" | Resigned February 17, 1819, to become U.S. Minister to Spain.Winner was elected in the next Congress.
| colspan=2 rowspan=2 | Not filled until next Congress
|-
| Kentucky(2)
|  | John J. Crittenden (DR)
| style="font-size:80%" | Resigned March 3, 1819, to return to private practice.Winner was elected in the next Congress.
|}

House of Representatives 

|-
| nowrap | 
| Vacant
| Member-elect Henry B. Lee died before this Congress began
|  | James Tallmadge Jr. (DR)
| Seated June 6, 1817

|-
| 
| Vacant
| Seat remained vacant from March 4, 1817, to August 4, 1817
| John Scott
| Seated August 4, 1817

|-
| 
| Vacant
| Member-elect David Scott resigned before this Congress began
|  | John Murray (DR)
| Seated October 14, 1817

|-
| 
| Vacant
| Member-elect Alexander McMillan died before this Congress began
|  | James Stewart (F)
| Seated January 5, 1818

|-
| 
|  | John C. Calhoun (DR)
| Resigned November 3, 1817, after being appointed United States Secretary of War
|  | Eldred Simkins (DR)
| Seated January 24, 1818

|-
| 
| rowspan=2 | Vacant
| rowspan=2 | Seat remained vacant until Mississippi was admitted to the Union December 10, 1817
| rowspan=2  | George Poindexter (DR)
| rowspan=2 | Seated December 10, 1817

|-
| 

|-
| 
|  | Uriel Holmes (F)
| Resigned sometime in 1818
|  | Sylvester Gilbert (DR)
| Seated November 16, 1818

|-
| 
|  | Daniel Forney (DR)
| Resigned sometime in 1818
|  | William Davidson (F)
| Seated December 2, 1818

|-
| 
| Vacant
| The first delegate from this new territory was not seated until January 29, 1818.
| John Crowell
| Seated January 29, 1818

|-
| 
|  | Albion K. Parris (DR
| Resigned February 3, 1818
|  | Enoch Lincoln (DR)
| Seated November 4, 1818

|-
| 
|  | Peterson Goodwyn (DR)
| Died February 21, 1818
|  | John Pegram (DR)
| Seated April 21, 1818

|-
| 
|  | John Ross (DR)
| Resigned February 24, 1818, to become President Judge of Pennsylvania's 7th Judicial Circuit
|  | Thomas J. Rogers (DR)
| Seated March 3, 1818

|-
| 
|  | Thomas B. Robertson (DR)
| Resigned April 20, 1818
|  | Thomas Butler (DR)
| Seated November 16, 1818

|-
| 
|  | Jacob Spangler (DR)
| Resigned April 20, 1818
|  | Jacob Hostetter (DR)
| Seated November 16, 1818

|-
| 
|  | Samuel D. Ingham (DR)
| Resigned July 6, 1818
|  | Samuel Moore (DR)
| Seated October 13, 1818

|-
| 
|  | John Forsyth (DR)
| Resigned November 23, 1818, after being elected to the U.S. Senate
|  | Robert R. Reid (DR)
| Seated February 18, 1819

|-
| 
| rowspan=2 | Nathaniel Pope
| rowspan=2 | Pope's term ended November 30, 1818, and the seat remained vacant until Illinois was admitted to the Union December 3, 1818
| rowspan=2  | John McLean (DR)
| rowspan=2 | Seated December 3, 1818

|-
| 

|-
| 
|  | George Mumford (DR)
| Died December 31, 1818
|  | Charles Fisher (DR)
| Seated February 11, 1819

|-
| 
|  | Heman Allen (DR)
| resigned April 20, 1818
| Vacant

|}

Committees
Lists of committees and their party leaders.

Senate

 Audit and Control the Contingent Expenses of the Senate (Chairman: Abner Lacock)
 Claims (Chairman: Jonathan Roberts then Robert Henry Goldsborough)
 Commerce and Manufactures (Chairman: Nathan Sanford)
 District of Columbia (Chairman: Robert Henry Goldsborough)
 Engrossed Bills (Chairman: John J. Crittenden)
 Finance (Chairman: George W. Campbell then John Wayles Eppes)
 Foreign Relations (Chairman: James Barbour then Nathaniel Macon)
 Indian Title to Certain Lands (Select)
 Judiciary (Chairman: John J. Crittenden then James Burrill Jr.) 
 Military Affairs (Chairman: George M. Troup then John Williams)
 Militia (Chairman: Clement Storer then Benjamin Ruggles)
 Mississippi's Admission to the Union (Select) 
 Naval Affairs (Chairman: Charles Tait then Nathan Sanford)
 Pensions (Chairman: James Noble then Abner Lacock)
 Post Office and Post Roads (Chairman: James J. Wilson then Montfort Stokes)
 Public Lands (Chairman: Jeremiah Morrow) 
 Seminole War (Select) 
 Slave Trade (Select)
 Whole

House of Representatives

 Accounts (Chairman: Peter Little)
 Alabama's Admission to the Union (Select)
 Arkansas Territory (Select)
 Bank of the United States (Select) 
 Claims (Chairman: Lewis Williams)
 Commerce and Manufactures (Chairman: Thomas Newton Jr.)
 District of Columbia (Chairman: John C. Herbert)
 Elections (Chairman: John W. Taylor) 
 Expenditures in the Navy Department (Chairman: James Pleasants)
 Expenditures in the Post Office Department (Chairman: Samuel D. Ingham)
 Expenditures in the State Department (Chairman: John Forsyth)
 Expenditures in the Treasury Department (Chairman: William Lowndes)
 Expenditures in the War Department (Chairman: Richard M. Johnson)
 Expenditures on Public Buildings (Chairman: Henry S. Tucker)
 Judiciary (Chairman: Hugh Nelson)
 Pensions and Revolutionary War Claims (Chairman: John Rhea)
 Private Land Claims (Chairman: Samuel Herrick then George Robertson)
 Post Office and Post Roads (Chairman: Samuel D. Ingham then Arthur Livermore)
 Public Expenditures (Chairman: Joseph Desha)
 Public Lands (Chairman: Thomas B. Robertson then George Poindexter)
 Revisal and Unfinished Business (Chairman: John Savage then John W. Taylor)
 Rules (Select) 
 Standards of Official Conduct 
 Ways and Means (Chairman: William Lowndes then Samuel Smith)
 Whole

Joint committees

 Enrolled Bills
 The Library (Chairman: N/A)

Employees

Legislative branch agency directors 
Architect of the Capitol: Benjamin H. Latrobe, resigned November 20, 1817
 Charles Bulfinch, appointed January 8, 1818
Librarian of Congress: George Watterston

Senate 
Chaplain: Sereno Edwards Dwight, Congregationalist, until December 9, 1817
 William D. Hawley, Episcopalian, elected December 9, 1817
 John Clark, Presbyterian, elected November 19, 1818
Secretary: Charles Cutts
Sergeant at Arms: Mountjoy Bayly

House of Representatives 
 Chaplain: Burgiss Allison (Baptist)
 Clerk: Thomas Dougherty
 Doorkeeper: Thomas Claxton
 Reading Clerks: 
 Sergeant at Arms: Thomas Dunn

See also 
 1816 United States elections (elections leading to this Congress)
 1816 United States presidential election
 1816–17 United States Senate elections
 1816–17 United States House of Representatives elections
 1818 United States elections (elections during this Congress, leading to the next Congress)
 1818–19 United States Senate elections
 1818–19 United States House of Representatives elections

Notes

References

External links
Statutes at Large, 1789–1875 
Senate Journal, First Forty-three Sessions of Congress
House Journal, First Forty-three Sessions of Congress
Biographical Directory of the U.S. Congress 
U.S. House of Representatives: House History 
U.S. Senate: Statistics and Lists